Arístides del Puerto (born 17 January 1947) is a Paraguayan footballer. He played in 15 matches for the Paraguay national football team from 1966 to 1971. He was also part of Paraguay's squad for the 1967 South American Championship.

References

External links
 

1947 births
Living people
Paraguayan footballers
Paraguay international footballers
Association football forwards